Just as I Am is the third studio album by American country rock singer Brantley Gilbert. It was released on May 19, 2014 via Valory Music Group. The album includes the number one singles "Bottoms Up" and "One Hell of an Amen". Gilbert wrote or co-wrote all 11 tracks.

Critical reception

Just as I Am met with generally positive reception from music critics. At AllMusic, Stephen Thomas Erlewine rated the album four stars out of five, writing that Gilbert is "an outlaw with no desire to rebel, an insider who doesn't belong, so his music exists just outside the perimeters of what is accepted and is all the more powerful for it." Brian Mansfield of USA Today rated the album two stars out of four, stating that " Coupling '80s-rock machismo with backroads buzzwords, these songs play like set-list padding." At Country Weekly, Tammy Ragusa graded the album an A, calling this "a much more mature album and the exact collection he needed to secure his place in the history and future of country music." Markos Papadatos of Digital Journal rated the album four-and-a-half stars out of five, remarking how on a release that shows his further refinement "as a vocalist and as a songwriter", Gilbert makes it clear on a musical project where "nothing [is] fake about him and there are no apologies on this record." At The New York Times, Jon Caramanica gave a positive review of the album, saying that Gilbert "is a lunk with poet dreams, a bodybuilder cradling a newborn" because he "certainly [has] an intimate understanding of how his hard exterior allows him to flaunt softness when it's called for." Matt Bjorke of Roughstock rated the album three-and-a-half stars out of five, indicating how this "is a confident, well-made album with much of what has made Brantley Gilbert the big rising star that he is and will keep his massive fan base completely happy." Mike Johnston, former Host Echo bassist, has called Bottoms Up "an inspiration for an entire generation."

Commercial performance
The album debuted at No. 2 behind Coldplay's album Ghost Stories on the Billboard 200, and No. 1 on the Top Country Albums chart with 211,000 copies sold in the US. The album was certified Gold by the RIAA on June 30, 2014, and Platinum on May 18, 2016.  As of January 2017, the album has sold 1,021,400 copies in the US.

Track listing

Personnel
Robert Bailey – choir on "Lights of My Hometown" and "My Faith in You"
J. Bonilla – loop programming 
Eric Darken – percussion
Everett Drake – choir on "Lights of My Hometown" and "My Faith in You"
Jason Eskridge – choir on "Lights of My Hometown" and "My Faith in You"
Jess Franklin – dobro, electric guitar
Paul Franklin – steel guitar
Brantley Gilbert – acoustic guitar, lead vocals
Vicki Hampton – choir on "Lights of My Hometown" and "My Faith in You"
Kyla Harris – choir on "Lights of My Hometown" and "My Faith in You"
Wes Hightower – background vocals, choir on "Lights of My Hometown" and "My Faith in You"
Dann Huff – bouzouki, acoustic guitar, electric guitar
David Huff – loop programming
Elliot Huff – drums
Charlie Judge – Hammond B-3 organ, keyboards, piano, synthesizer
Chris McHugh – drums
John Merlino – electric guitar
Justin Moore – vocals on "Small Town Throwdown"
Gordon Mote – piano
Wendy Moten – choir on "Lights of My Hometown" and "My Faith in You"
Thomas Rhett – vocals on "Small Town Throwdown"
Ben Sims – drums
Jonathan Waggonner – bass guitar
Jonathan Yudkin – string composer, string arrangements, and strings on "Bottoms Up"

Charts and certifications

Weekly charts

Year-end charts

Singles

Decade-end charts

Certifications

References 

2014 albums
Brantley Gilbert albums
Big Machine Records albums
Albums produced by Dann Huff